A box is a container or package, usually with parallel, flat, rectangular sides.

Box or boxes may also refer to:

Arts, entertainment and media

Fictional characters
Box (comics), a Marvel comics superhero
Box, a robot in the 1976 film Logan's Run

Film
Box (film), a 2015 Romanian film
BOX: The Hakamada Case, a 2010 documentary about boxer Iwao Hakamada
Boxes (film), a 2007 French film

Music
Box (Chocolate Starfish album), 1995
Box (Gas album), 2016
Boxes (Goo Goo Dolls album), 2016, and the title track
Box (Guided by Voices album), 1995
Boxes (Sydney Dance Company album), 1985
Box (Sam Brown album), 1997
Box, a 1996 album by Christie Hennessy
Box, a 1995 album by Dive
Box, a 2006 album by Mellowdrone
 "Boxes", a 2007 song by Charlie Winston from Make Way
 "Boxes", a 2020 song by Moses Sumney from Græ

Places
Box, Gloucestershire, England
Box, Wiltshire, England
Box Tunnel, a railway tunnel
River Box, Suffolk, England
Box, Oklahoma, United States
Box Hill (disambiguation)

Persons

Betty E. Box (1915 – 1999), British film producer, brother of Sydney
George Edward Pelham Box (1919-2013), British statistician
George Herbert Box (1869-1933), British Old Testament scholar
Pelham Horton Box (1898-1937), British historian
Sidney Box (1873 – 1958), British trade unionist and political activist.
Sydney Box (1907 – 1983), British film producer and screenwriter

Science and technology
Box, common name of the plant genus Buxus
Box, common name of some species of Eucalyptus trees
GNOME Boxes, a virtualization application for the GNOME desktop environment
□ ("box") operator in mathematics, used for:
Logical necessity in modal logic
Conway box function
D'Alembert operator
Cuboid, a geometric figure
Hyperrectangle, in geometry
BOXES algorithm, used by the Matchbox Educable Noughts and Crosses Engine
Buried oxide layer, in semiconductor fabrication

Sport
Box (juggling), a juggling pattern for three objects
Box, an American football term
Box, an abdominal guard in cricket clothing and equipment
Box, to participate in boxing, a combat sport
Penalty box, or simply box, a place where sports players assigned penalties sit

Other uses
Box (company), a file sharing and cloud content management company
Box (surname), including a list of people with the name
Box (theatre), a small, separated area
Box (torture), a method of solitary confinement
Box, a type of Hi-Riser automobile
 MI5, the British Security Service, called "Box 500" or "Box"
Boston Options Exchange, or BOX
Borroloola Airport, IATA airport code "BOX"
Box, Design & Build, Design and Building company

See also

Black box (disambiguation)
Boxer (disambiguation)
Boxing (disambiguation)
Boxy (disambiguation)
Booth (disambiguation)
Fusebox (disambiguation)
Strongbox (disambiguation)
The Box (disambiguation)